Velibor "Bora" Milutinović (born 7 September 1944) is a Serbian former professional footballer and manager. 

He has managed at five editions of the FIFA World Cup, tied for the record alongside Brazilian manager Carlos Alberto Parreira, but did so in five consecutive World Cups with different teams: Mexico (1986), Costa Rica (1990), the United States (1994), Nigeria (1998), and China (2002). He is also the first manager to take four teams beyond the first round – all but China – earning the nickname of Miracle Worker, first given to him by Alan Rothenberg, then president of the United States Soccer Federation. In total Milutinović has managed eight national football teams.

Managing career

World Cup national teams

Mexico (1983–86)

Milutinović led Mexico to the quarter-finals at the 1986 FIFA World Cup, its highest finish. Mexico fell in the quarter-finals to West Germany on penalty kicks.

Costa Rica (1990)

Milutinović took over Costa Rica just before the 1990 FIFA World Cup and got Costa Rica into the second round. In 1990, Milutinović was hired as head coach of Costa Rica just 90 days before the World Cup. He cut the captain and other starters. Costa Rica managed to beat Scotland and Sweden and lost to Brazil, 1–0, before losing 4–1 to Czechoslovakia in the second round.

United States (1991–95)

Hank Steinbrecher, general secretary of the U.S. Soccer Federation, conducted the job interviews for the U.S. national team head coach position. American coaches had not proved their worth on the international stage, as the United States had lost all three games in the 1990 World Cup finals under Bob Gansler. When the USSF's search began in 1991, the emphasis was not so much on experience, but on finding a coach who could squeeze the last drop of potential out of a lightly regarded team, and Milutinović's name came up again and again. He had coached first Mexico, then Costa Rica to surprising World Cup success.

Milutinović left no doubts about who ran the team, cutting two U.S. players, Peter Vermes and Desmond Armstrong, board members of the national federation, from his World Cup team. Milutinović further cut Bruce Murray, the all-time leading U.S. goal scorer. When Alexi Lalas first showed up at training camp, Milutinović told him to get a haircut or get off the team.

Milutinović coached the U.S. national team at the 1994 FIFA World Cup, hosted in the United States, where the team notched its first win in the World Cup since 1950 and progressed to the knockout round of the tournament for the first time since the 1930s.  This was hailed as a success for a country with little soccer experience.

The USSF fired Milutinović on 14 April 1995, saying it wanted someone who could be both coach and administrator. Milutinović reportedly wanted no part of the administrative duties.

Nigeria (1997–98)

Milutinović coached the Nigerian team at the 1998 FIFA World Cup in France. Nigeria won its group, notching a notable 3–2 upset win over Spain, and reached the knockout rounds. This was the fourth team that Milutinović had taken to the knockout rounds of the World Cup, a coaching record.

China (2000–02)

Under Milutinović's coaching, for the first time ever, the Chinese national football team qualified to be among the 32 finalists for the World Cup in 2002. He was hailed as a hero in China, ending a 44-year drought, and was popularly known as Milu. However, unlike his previous forays, Milutinović could not take the Chinese team past the first round due to their inexperience at the world stage.

Other national teams

Honduras (2003–04)

In the summer of 2003, Milutinović was in serious negotiations to finally take over the national team at his native Serbia. Despite heavy, month-long persuasion from Serbian football officials, Milutinović turned down the offer and soon signed on to the Honduras national team. He led the team to the first round of CONCACAF qualifiers before resigning on 30 June 2004. He cited "the prevailing bad atmosphere, created by comments made by the country's managers, officials and press" as the reason for his leaving during World Cup qualifying.

Jamaica (2006–07)

On 16 November 2006, Milutinović was announced as head coach of Jamaica. On 9 November 2007, following a string of six consecutive friendly defeats, he was fired by the Jamaican FA.

Iraq (2009)

Milutinović led the Iraq national football team in group play in the 2009 FIFA Confederations Cup for two draws and one loss, failing to reach the knockout stage.

Club teams

Milutinović's managerial career at club level has seen more mixed success. His longest managerial spell for a single club was his tenure with UNAM of Mexico from 1977 to 1983. Several of his Pumas players ended up playing for Mexico at the 1986 World Cup.

Since then, he has managed briefly for several club teams. He managed Udinese Calcio of the Italian Serie B for nine matches in 1987. He then managed the MetroStars of Major League Soccer to the worst record in league history in 1999. He also had a brief stint in the Qatar Stars League with Al-Sadd in the 2004–05 season.

Managerial statistics

Personal life

Milutinović comes from a footballing family; he and his two brothers Miloš and Milorad played together for Partizan.

His father was killed in World War II, his mother by tuberculosis soon after the war. He said he does not remember either of his parents. He was raised by an aunt, and raised playing football.

Milutinović is married to a Mexican and currently resides in Qatar. Aside from his native Serbo-Croatian, he is fluent in English, Spanish, Italian and French.

Honours

Player

UNAM
Copa MX: 1974–75
Campeón de Campeones: 1975

Manager

UNAM 
Liga MX: 1980–81
CONCACAF Champions' Cup: 1980, 1982
Copa Interamericana: 1981

United States 
Gold Cup: 1991

Mexico
Gold Cup: 1996

References

External links

Bora Milutinović's match-by-match record with various countries (rsssf.com)

1944 births
Living people
People from Bajina Bašta
Yugoslav footballers
Serbian footballers
1986 FIFA World Cup managers
1990 FIFA World Cup managers
1992 King Fahd Cup managers
1993 Copa América managers
1994 FIFA World Cup managers
1998 FIFA World Cup managers
2000 AFC Asian Cup managers
2002 FIFA World Cup managers
2009 FIFA Confederations Cup managers
Association football midfielders
OFK Beograd players
FK Partizan players
FC Winterthur players
AS Monaco FC players
OGC Nice players
FC Rouen players
Club Universidad Nacional footballers
Ligue 1 players
Ligue 2 players
Liga MX players
Expatriate footballers in Switzerland
Expatriate footballers in Monaco
Expatriate footballers in France
Expatriate footballers in Mexico
Expatriate football managers in Mexico
Expatriate football managers in Argentina
Expatriate football managers in Italy
Expatriate football managers in Costa Rica
Expatriate soccer managers in the United States
Expatriate football managers in Nigeria
Expatriate football managers in China
Expatriate football managers in Honduras
Expatriate football managers in Qatar
Expatriate football managers in Jamaica
Expatriate football managers in Iraq
Club Universidad Nacional managers
Mexico national football team managers
San Lorenzo de Almagro managers
Udinese Calcio managers
C.D. Veracruz managers
Tecos F.C. managers
Costa Rica national football team managers
United States men's national soccer team managers
Nigeria national football team managers
New York Red Bulls coaches
China national football team managers
Honduras national football team managers
Al Sadd SC managers
Jamaica national football team managers
Iraq national football team managers
CONCACAF Gold Cup-winning managers
Serbia and Montenegro expatriate football managers
Serbia and Montenegro expatriate sportspeople in the United States
Serbia and Montenegro expatriate sportspeople in Mexico
Serbia and Montenegro expatriate sportspeople in Nigeria
Serbia and Montenegro expatriate sportspeople in China
Serbia and Montenegro expatriate sportspeople in Honduras
Serbia and Montenegro expatriate sportspeople in Qatar
Serbia and Montenegro football managers
Serbian expatriate football managers
Serbian expatriate footballers
Serbian football managers
Serbian expatriate sportspeople in Argentina
Serbian expatriate sportspeople in Italy
Serbian expatriate sportspeople in Nigeria
Serbian expatriate sportspeople in China
Serbian expatriate sportspeople in Honduras
Serbian expatriate sportspeople in Qatar
Serbian expatriate sportspeople in Jamaica
Serbian expatriate sportspeople in Iraq
Serbian expatriate sportspeople in Switzerland
Serbian expatriate sportspeople in Monaco
Serbian expatriate sportspeople in France
Yugoslav expatriate footballers
Yugoslav expatriate football managers
Yugoslav expatriate sportspeople in Argentina
Yugoslav expatriate sportspeople in Italy
Yugoslav expatriate sportspeople in Costa Rica
Yugoslav expatriate sportspeople in the United States
Yugoslav expatriate sportspeople in Switzerland
Yugoslav expatriate sportspeople in Monaco
Yugoslav expatriate sportspeople in France
Yugoslav expatriate sportspeople in Mexico
Yugoslav football managers
Yugoslav First League players